Min Htin Aung Han is a Burmese politician who currently serves as a Mon State Hluttaw member of parliament for Mawlamyaing Township № 1 Constituency.

Min served as a minister of Electricity, Energy and Industry for Mon State from April 2016 to 29 May 2018. He is a member of the National League for Democracy.

Early life and education 
Min Htin Aung Han was born on 28 January 1967 in Mawlamyaing, Mon State,  Myanmar. He graduated B.E(Electrical Power).

Political career 
In the 2015 Myanmar general election, he was elected as a Mon State Hluttaw MP,  from Mawlamyaing No.1 parliamentary  constituency.

References

National League for Democracy politicians
Living people
People from Mon State
1967 births